Battledore and shuttlecock, or  jeu de volant, is an early sport related to modern badminton. The game is played by two or more people using small rackets (battledores), made of parchment or rows of gut stretched across wooden frames, and shuttlecocks, made of a base of some light material, such as cork, with trimmed feathers fixed around the top. The object is for players to bat the shuttlecock from one to the other as many times as possible without allowing it to fall to the ground.

History 

Games with a shuttlecock are attested to as early as 2,000 years ago, and have been popular in India, China, Japan, and Siam. Various traditional shuttlecock games have been played by North American indigenous peoples, including the Kwakiutl, Pima, Salish, and Zuni; they are often played with a feathered shuttle made of corn husk or twigs and sometimes a wooden battledore. In Europe, battledore and shuttlecock was played by children for centuries, and ancient drawings appearing to depict the game have been found in Greece. Its most popular modern development is the game of badminton.

See also
Hanetsuki, a Japanese variant

References

Racket sports